Imre Simon (August 14, 1943 – August 13, 2009) was a Hungarian-born Brazilian mathematician and computer scientist.

His research mainly focused on theoretical computer science, automata theory, and tropical mathematics, a subject he founded, and which was so named because he lived in Brazil.  He was a professor of mathematics at the University of São Paulo in Brazil. He was also actively interested in questions of intellectual property and collaborative work, and was an enthusiastic advocate for open collaborative information systems, of which Wikipedia is an example.

He received his Ph.D. at the  University of Waterloo in 1972, under Janusz Brzozowski  with the thesis: Hierarchies of Events with Dot-Depth One.

He died of lung cancer in São Paulo, Brazil on August 13, 2009,  aged 65 just a day short of his 66th birthday.

References

External links
 
 Personal home page

Brazilian computer scientists
Hungarian emigrants to Brazil
20th-century  Brazilian mathematicians
2009 deaths
1943 births
Deaths from lung cancer
Recipients of the Great Cross of the National Order of Scientific Merit (Brazil)
Academic staff of the University of São Paulo